Prince Daudi Kintu Wasajja also called David Wasajja (born 1966) is a prince of Buganda, the largest traditional kingdom in Uganda.

Personal life
He is the youngest son of the late Kabaka Muteesa II, the 35th Kabaka the Kingdom of Buganda, and Winifred Keihangwe, an Ankole princess. Accordingly, he is the youngest brother of Muwenda Mutebi II the current Kabaka of Buganda. He was still in the womb when Milton Obote’s soldiers raided the Mengo Palace in 1966. His pregnant mother, unable to flee, was arrested and locked up in Luzira Prison for several days, only being released for a few hours before going into labor. His father, the Kabaka, had fled the burning palace in disguise.

On 24 November 2018 he survived an accident in Lake Victoria, where a cruise boat carrying party revellers capsized, killing 33 people.

Education
Prince Wasajja holds the degree of Bachelor of Arts (BA) from the University of Nottingham, in the United Kingdom.

Career
Wasajja only returned home in 1996 and was immediately appointed executive underwriter for Pan World Insurance. Later, he moved on to become the retail regional manager for Celtel. In his capacity as a prince he has represented his brother the current Kabaka at high-profile functions, like the wedding of Muhoozi Kainerugaba and Charlotte Kuteesa. He accompanied his brother at crisis talks between the Kingdom of Buganda and the Republic of Uganda in September 2009 called after rioting in Kampala over the status of the renegade Kayunga District and the closure of a royalist Buganda radio station. Local media claims Wasajja to be one of the eccentric "Hash Harriers", a group of Kampala socialites. He is also an avid runner and shooter.

Personal Life
On 25 April 2013, Prince Wasajja wed Ms. Marion Nankya the daughter of the then Member of Parliament for Bukoto South, Mathias Nsubuga. The wedding was at Rubaga Cathedral with a reception being held at the official residence of the Kabaka in Mengo. It also marked the first time the Kabaka had attended both the church and reception as traditionally he is not supposed to be attend such functions. On 18 January 2014, Ms. Nankya was safely delivered of a baby boy at Nakasero Hospital, in Kampala. The baby was named Prince Edward Mbogo in memory of his late grandfather Sir Edward Mutesa (Muteesa II of Buganda) and his late great grand uncle Nuuhu Mbogo, a renowned Buganda prince and leader of Islam in Buganda. Mbogo was Kabaka Mwanga’s brother.

See also
 Muwenda Mutebi II of Buganda
 Kabaka of Buganda

References

Buganda
1966 births
Living people
People from Kampala District
Alumni of the University of Nottingham
People educated at Namilyango College
Ugandan Roman Catholics